Apex Institute & R.I.O.s in India

Apex institute

Dr. R.P. Centre for Ophthalmic Sciences, New Delhi

Dr. Rajendra Prasad Centre for Ophthalmic Sciences at All India Institute of Medical Sciences has been recognized as the Apex Organisation by the Government of India under the National Programme for the Control of Blindness. This programme was launched in 1976 to combat blindness in India.

R.I.O.s in cities in India
Regional Institute of Ophthalmology, BHU, Varanasi.
Regional Institute of Ophthalmology, Hyderabad
Regional Institute of Ophthalmology, Kolkata
Regional Institute of Ophthalmology, Guwahati
Regional Institute of Ophthalmology, Bhopal
Regional Institute of Ophthalmology, Sitapur
Regional Institute of Ophthalmology, Patna
Regional Institute of Ophthalmology, Thiruvananthapuram
Regional Institute of Ophthalmology and Government Ophthalmic Hospital, Chennai
Regional Institute of Ophthalmology, Ahmedabad
Regional Institute of Ophthalmology, Bangalore
Regional Institute of Ophthalmology, Allahabad
Regional Institute of Ophthalmology, Raipur
Regional Institute of Ophthalmology, Jaipur
Regional Institute of Ophthalmology, Ranchi
Regional Institute of Ophthalmology, Cuttak
Regional Institute of Ophthalmology, Rohtak
Regional Institute of Ophthalmology, Mumbai
Regional Institute of Ophthalmology, Punjab

References

External links
Dr. R.P. Centre for Ophthalmic Sciences, AIIMS, New Delhi
Regional Institute of Ophthalmology and Government Ophthalmic Hospital, Chennai
Regional Institute of Ophthalmology, Guwahati
Regional Institute of Ophthalmology, Sitapur
Regional Institute of Ophthalmology, Thiruvananthapuram

Organizations
Universities and colleges in Bhopal
Medical colleges in Madhya Pradesh